For All of This is the first EP from The Early November. It was written entirely by the lead singer, Arthur 'Ace' Enders, and features brief replacement guitarist (of Joseph Marro), John Dubitsky.  Its title comes from the first line of the chorus in "I Want to Hear You Sad".

Track listing
All songs written by Arthur Enders.
 "Every Night's Another Story"  – 2:46
 "I Want to Hear You Sad"  – 3:30
 "All We Ever Needed"  – 3:00
 "Sunday Drive"  – 3:53
 "Take Time and Find"  – 3:43
 "Ashala Rock"  – 2:50
 "Come Back"  – 2:54
 "We Write the Wrong"  – 9:17

 The Enhanced CD comes with a video of Ace playing "Open Eyes" (previously unreleased) and "Sunday Drive" on an acoustic guitar in his basement.
 "I Want To Hear You Sad" has an acoustic rendition on Aces band I Can Make A Mess Like Nobody's Business acoustic album "Dust'n Off the Ol" Gee-Tar."

Personnel
Sergio Anello — bass
John Dubitsky — guitar
Arthur 'Ace' Enders — vocals, guitar
Jeff Kummer — drums

References

The Early November albums
Albums produced by Chris Badami
2002 EPs
Drive-Thru Records EPs